In enzymology, an acetoin-ribose-5-phosphate transaldolase is an enzyme that catalyzes the chemical reaction

3-hydroxybutan-2-one + D-ribose 5-phosphate  acetaldehyde + 1-deoxy-D-altro-heptulose 7-phosphate

Thus, the two substrates of this enzyme are 3-hydroxybutan-2-one and D-ribose 5-phosphate, whereas its two products are acetaldehyde and 1-deoxy-D-altro-heptulose 7-phosphate.

This enzyme belongs to the family of transferases, specifically those transferring aldehyde or ketonic groups (transaldolases and transketolases, respectively).  The systematic name of this enzyme class is 3-hydroxybutan-2-one:D-ribose-5-phosphate aldehydetransferase. Other names in common use include 1-deoxy-D-altro-heptulose-7-phosphate synthetase, 1-deoxy-D-altro-heptulose-7-phosphate synthase, 3-hydroxybutan-2-one:D-ribose-5-phosphate aldehydetransferase [wrong, and substrate name].  It employs one cofactor, thiamin diphosphate.

References

 

EC 2.2.1
Thiamine enzymes
Enzymes of unknown structure